Yacka is a small town in the shallow valley of the Broughton River in the Mid North of South Australia. It lies where the Horrocks Highway (Main North Road) crosses the Broughton River midway between Clare and Gladstone. It was also a station on the Gladstone-Balaklava railway, built as narrow gauge in 1894, converted to broad gauge in 1927 and closed by 1993.

The town name is a shortened form of 'Yackamoorundie' an indigenous place name for the area which was used to name Yackamoorundie Creek.

See also
 Hundred of Yackamoorundie

References

Towns in South Australia
Mid North (South Australia)